Peta-Gaye Dowdie (born 18 January 1977) is a Jamaican sprinter. As a member of the Jamaican sprint relay team she won a bronze medal at the 1999 World Championships and gold medals at the 2006 Commonwealth Games and 2007 Pan American Games.

Dowdie ran track collegiately at Louisiana State University.

External links
IAAF profile for Peta-Gaye Dowdie

1977 births
Jamaican female sprinters
Living people
LSU Lady Tigers track and field athletes
Athletes (track and field) at the 1999 Pan American Games
Athletes (track and field) at the 2007 Pan American Games
Pan American Games gold medalists for Jamaica
Pan American Games bronze medalists for Jamaica
Pan American Games medalists in athletics (track and field)
Athletes (track and field) at the 2006 Commonwealth Games
Commonwealth Games medallists in athletics
Commonwealth Games gold medallists for Jamaica
World Athletics Championships medalists
Medalists at the 1999 Pan American Games
Medalists at the 2007 Pan American Games
20th-century Jamaican women
Medallists at the 2006 Commonwealth Games